Maickol Pio Martins Aristegui (born 29 April 1993) is a Uruguayan professional footballer who plays as a midfielder or striker for Kosovan club Liria.

Career
In 2014, Martins signed for Uruguayan top flight side Tacuarembó from Deportivo Maldonado in the Uruguayan second division, before joining Curaçao club Scherpenheuvel.

Before the second half of 2017–18, he signed for Al Nabi Chit in Lebanon, where he suffered an injury.

Before the second half of 2018–19, Martins signed for Kosovan side Liria Prizren.

References

External links
 

1993 births
Living people
People from Punta del Este
Uruguayan footballers
Association football midfielders
Association football forwards
C.A. Rentistas players
Deportivo Maldonado players
Tacuarembó F.C. players
RKSV Scherpenheuvel players
Al Nabi Chit SC players
KF Liria players
Uruguayan Segunda División players
Uruguayan Primera División players
Lebanese Premier League players
Uruguayan expatriate footballers
Uruguayan expatriate sportspeople in Curaçao
Expatriate footballers in Curaçao
Uruguayan expatriate sportspeople in Lebanon
Expatriate footballers in Lebanon
Uruguayan expatriate sportspeople in Kosovo
Expatriate footballers in Kosovo